Sultan Gasanovich Dzhamilov (born 18 July 1995) is a Russian football player. He plays for FC Neftekhimik Nizhnekamsk.

Club career
He made his debut in the Russian Football National League for FC Baltika Kaliningrad on 4 October 2020 in a game against FC Yenisey Krasnoyarsk.

References

External links
 Profile by Russian Football National League
 

1995 births
Footballers from Moscow
Living people
Russian footballers
Association football midfielders
FC Spartak Moscow players
FC Znamya Truda Orekhovo-Zuyevo players
FC Druzhba Maykop players
FC Baltika Kaliningrad players
FC Neftekhimik Nizhnekamsk players
Russian First League players
Russian Second League players